Swine Trek is
 the spacecraft in Pigs in Space,
 an episode of Garfield and Friends, see List of Garfield and Friends episodes#Season 2 (1989).